Milton Addas "Mitt" Romney (June 20, 1899 – November 10, 1975) was an American professional football player who played in the offensive backfield for the Racine Legion from 1923 to 1924 and was a quarterback for the Chicago Bears from 1925 to 1928. Romney played quarterback for the University of Chicago in the early 1920s when it had a winning varsity team, and was elected captain of the team in 1922. After graduating from the University of Chicago in 1923, Romney was head basketball coach at the University of Texas at Austin during the 1922–23 season. He coached the Longhorns to a record of 11–7.

Romney was born in Salt Lake City, Utah. He is the cousin of George W. Romney, father of former Massachusetts Governor, 2012 Republican Presidential Candidate and current junior Utah Senator Mitt Romney. Mitt Romney is his namesake and is a first cousin once removed. Romney died in Little Rock, Arkansas on November 10, 1975.

Head coaching record

References

1899 births
1975 deaths
American football fullbacks
American football halfbacks
American football quarterbacks
Basketball coaches from Utah
Racine Legion players
Chicago Bears players
Chicago Maroons football players
Texas Longhorns football coaches
Texas Longhorns men's basketball coaches
Utah Utes football players
Romney family
Sportspeople from Salt Lake City
Players of American football from Salt Lake City